Unsub may refer to:

 Unsub (TV series), a 1989 television series starring David Soul as a forensic investigator
 Unsub Records, an American record label
 "Unknown subject" or "Unidentified subject of an investigation", jargon for person of interest used in some American TV crime shows
 Unsub, an analytics service by Our Research to help libraries cancel subscriptions